Arachnopezizaceae is a family of fungi belonging to the order Helotiales.

Genera:
 Arachnopeziza Fuckel
 Arachnoscypha Boud.
 Austropezia B.M.Spooner, 1987
 Eriopezia (Sacc.) Rehm

References

Helotiales
Ascomycota families